The Man Inside is a 1916 American silent mystery film directed by John G. Adolfi and starring Edwin Stevens, Tina Marshall and Charles Burbridge.  It was based on the novel by Natalie Sumner Lincoln.

Cast
 Edwin Stevens as Barry / Dana Thornton 
 Tina Marshall as Eleanor 
 Charles Burbridge as Sen. Carew 
 Justina Huff as Cynthia 
 Billy Armstrong as Lt. Lane 
 Sidney Bracey as Winthrop 
 Harry Benham as Hunter 
 Louis Leon Hall as Brett 
 Gustave Thomas as Secretary of State 
 Florence Crawford as Yvette Deplau

References

Bibliography
 James Robert Parish & Michael R. Pitts. Film directors: a guide to their American films. Scarecrow Press, 1974.

External links

1916 films
1916 mystery films
American mystery films
Films directed by John G. Adolfi
American silent feature films
American black-and-white films
Universal Pictures films
1910s English-language films
1910s American films
Silent mystery films